I Gineka Tis Zois Sou (Greek: Η Γυναίκα Της Ζωής Σου; English: The Woman Of Your Life) is the debut studio album of Greek artist, Marianda Pieridi. It was released on 24 October 2002 by Universal Music Greece and Polydor and later received gold certification, selling 20,000 units in Greece.

Track listing

Singles
The following singles were officially released to radio stations and made into music videos. The songs "Me Sighoris", "I Gineka Tis Zois Sou" and "Blue Jean", despite not having been released as singles, managed to gain radio airplay with the following singles.

"S' Agapo"

"S' Agapo" was the lead single from the album and released on June 2002 with music video, directed by Kostas Kapetanidis. The song is a pop dance and gained massive radio airplay.

"Giro Mou"

"Giro Mou" was the second single from the album and released on October 2002 with music video, directed by Kostas Kapetanidis. The song is a laiko balad and had a good airplay after the last hit.

Credits

Personnel 

 Fotis Anagnostou – bass (tracks: 7)
 Giannis Bithikotsis – bouzouki (tracks: 3, 8, 9) / cura (tracks: 2, 3, 8) / baglama (tracks: 3, 8)
 Giorgos Chatzopoulos – guitars (tracks: 2, 3, 4, 5, 8, 9, 12)
 Pavlos Diamantopoulos – bass (tracks: 2, 3, 4, 8, 9)
 Spiros Dimitropoulos – guitars (tracks: 7)
 Vasilis Iliadis – säz (tracks: 6)
 Katerina Kiriakou – backing vocals (tracks: 2, 3, 4, 5, 6, 10, 12)
 Fedon Lionoudakis – accordion (tracks: 2, 3, 8)
 Andreas Mouzakis – drums (tracks: 2, 3, 4, 8, 9)
 Dimitris Paizis – programming, keyboards (tracks: 7, 11)
 Alex Panagi – backing vocals (tracks: 2, 3, 4, 5, 6, 10, 12) / second vocal (tracks: 9)
 Positive Energy – orchestration (tracks: 7, 11)
 Giorgos Roilos – percussion (tracks: 2, 3, 4, 8)
 Vasilis Rousis – drums (tracks: 7)
 Sokratis Soumelas – orchestration (tracks: 4)
 Thanasis Vasilopoulos – clarinet (tracks: 2, 5) / ney (tracks: 2)
 Alexandros Vourazelis – orchestration (tracks: 1, 2, 3, 5, 6, 8, 9, 10, 12) / programming, keyboards (tracks: 1, 2, 3, 4, 5, 6, 8, 9, 10, 12)
 Martha Zioga – backing vocals (tracks: 2, 3, 4, 5, 6, 10, 12)

Production 

 Christos Chatzistamou – mastering
 Dimitris Chorianopoulos – mix engineer, editing
 Sotiris Egkolfopoulos – sound engineer
 Panos Kallitsis – hair styling, make up
 Giorgos Segredakis – styling
 Sokratis Soumelas – executive producer
 Dimitris Stamatiou – sound engineer
 Katerina Tsatsani – photographer

Charts
I Gineka Tis Zois Mou made its debut at number 43 on the 'Top 50 Greek Albums' charts by IFPI.

After months, it was certified gold according to sales.

References

2002 debut albums
Greek-language albums
Mariada Pieridi albums
Universal Music Greece albums